The Metropolitan Condos, also known as the Block 9 Condominiums, is a skyscraper located at 1001 Northwest Lovejoy Street in Portland, Oregon's Pearl District, in the United States. Construction began in 2005 and was completed in 2007.

References

2007 establishments in Oregon
Condominiums in the United States
Residential buildings completed in 2007
Skyscrapers in Portland, Oregon